The 1991–92 Notre Dame Fighting Irish men's basketball team represented the University of Notre Dame during the 1991-92 college basketball season. The Fighting Irish, led by first-year coach John MacLeod, played their home games at the Joyce Center located in Notre Dame, IN as Independent members. They finished the season 18–15 and were invited to the 1992 National Invitation Tournament, where they advanced to the championship game before losing to Virginia 76–81 in overtime. During the season, they defeated five AP Top 25 teams.

Roster

Schedule

|-
!colspan=9 style=| NIT

References 

Notre Dame
Notre Dame
Notre Dame Fighting Irish men's basketball seasons
Notre Dame Fighting Irish
Notre Dame Fighting Irish